The Abag Formation  is located in the Inner Mongolia Autonomous Region and dates to the Pleistocene period.

References 

Geologic formations of China
Pleistocene Asia
Cenozoic China
Cenozoic Erathem of Asia
Paleontology in Inner Mongolia